Chan Sow Lin station is an integrated metro station in Pudu, Kuala Lumpur, Malaysia. The station serves as an interchange station between the LRT Sri Petaling Line, LRT Ampang Line and the MRT Putrajaya Line. The station consists of an at-grade station for the Ampang and Sri Petaling lines, and an underground station for the Putrajaya line. Both stations are connected by an elevated pedestrian walkway, allowing paid-to-paid integration.

The station is the first station on the common route shared by both the Ampang Line (Sentul Timur-Ampang) and Sri Petaling Line (Sentul Timur-Putra Heights). The station was first opened on 16 December 1996, as part of the first phase of the former STAR LRT system's opening, alongside 13 adjoining stations along the Sultan Ismail-Ampang route.

Chan Sow Lin is the last underground station on the Putrajaya Line, before the line resurfaces at Kuchai station.

Location
The station is located on the southern edge of the incorporated town of Pudu, serving the locality alongside Pudu station and Hang Tuah station. The station was thus intended to serve patrons from the southern end of Pudu, the western end of Taman Maluri and the northwestern tip of Taman Miharja. The latter two localities also have their own namesake stations towards the south and east: Miharja station and Maluri station. The interchange itself is named after an extended portion of Jalan Chan Sow Lin, a road that adjoins the main entrance of the station. The road was named after Chan Sow Lin (陳秀連), 1845–1927, a wealthy businessman in the iron works industry. This man was also known then as The Father of Chinese Iron Works in Malaya.

The station reuses the now defunct Federated Malay States Railway and Malayan Railway (KTM) route between Kuala Lumpur, Ampang and Salak South. Because of this, the station is located close to several former government compounds (Public Works and Engineering Works branches) that was once connected to the KTM line, up until the line was closed during the 1990s to make way for the STAR LRT line.

Ampang-Chan Sow Lin shuttle service 
Between July and December 2016, upon the opening of the Puchong Perdana-Putra Heights stretch of the LRT Sri Petaling Line Extension and the full deployment of the new CSR Zhuzhou trains on the Sentul Timur-Putra Heights stretch, the old Adtranz trains in use since 1996 were reduced to serve only the Ampang-Chan Sow Lin stretch pending the completion of the signalling system in the line. Commuters going from Ampang to Kuala Lumpur city centre (i.e. Masjid Jamek) or vice versa were required to alight at Chan Sow Lin and switch from the Adtranz trains to the new CSR Zhuzhou trains.

Direct travel between Ampang and Sentul Timur, as it was before July 2016, was restored on 1 December 2016, following the completion of the upgrading of the signalling system on the Ampang-Chan Sow Lin stretch, which also sees the wholescale replacement of the old Adtranz trains with the new CSR Zhuzhou trains.

Design
The principal styling of the station is similar to most other stations along the Ampang Line and Sri Petaling Line, featuring multi-tiered roofs supported by latticed frames, and white plastered walls and pillars. The platforms and tracks are at-grade, while the single ticket area is elevated at the same level as the footbridges crossing the tracks.

Platforms

Platform design and designation in the station is considerably unique. The station contains two island platforms along three tracks. Two of the tracks are linked and are assigned to trains heading for either Sentul Timur to the north, or Ampang or Putra Heights on the other end.

Labelled as Platforms 1 and 2, both platforms are further divided with "A" and "B" suffixes (thus reading "1A", "1B", "2A" and "2B"), with the "B" partitions sharing the single middle track, while the "A" partitions connect to the two outlying tracks. Platform 2A is assigned to trains heading towards Putra Heights or Ampang, while Platform 2B is assigned to the common route of the Ampang Line and Sri Petaling Line heading towards Sentul Timur. Platform 1A and Platform 1B are currently not in service.

Interchange

The station is specifically intended for passengers from stations exclusively on the Sri Petaling Line (Chan Sow Lin-Putra Heights) to interchange with stations exclusively on the Ampang Line (Chan Sow Lin-Ampang), or vice versa. Interchanges in such manner typically involves disembarking a train at one side of the platform, waiting, and embarking on another train that arrives at the opposing side of the platform. Alternatively, passengers can interchange between the two lines at any station between Chan Sow Lin and Sentul Timur as these stations are shared by both the Ampang Line and Sri Petaling Line.

The station is designated as an interchange station with the MRT Putrajaya line, scheduled to open on 16 March 2023. The MRT portion of the station is underground and was built beside the existing LRT station. The lines are linked with a pedestrian access that ensures paid-to-paid area transfer between the LRT and MRT.

Exits and entrances

See also
 Maluri station, similar layout and function

 List of rail transit stations in Klang Valley

References

External links 
Chan Sow Lin LRT Station – mrt.com.my

Ampang Line
Railway stations opened in 1996
1996 establishments in Malaysia